The 2013–14 Toronto Maple Leafs season was the 97th season for the National Hockey League (NHL) franchise that was established on November 22, 1917. Due to a realignment that was approved on March 14, 2013, by the NHL's Board of Governors, the Maple Leafs played this season in the eight-team Atlantic Division of the Eastern Conference. For the first time since the 1997–98 season, they played every team in the league at least once both home and away. In fact, they played the Montreal Canadiens and the Buffalo Sabres five times each, every other team in their own division four times each, teams in the Metropolitan Division of the Eastern Conference three times each, and every team from the Western Conference twice.

The Maple Leafs played in the NHL Winter Classic against the Detroit Red Wings on January 1, 2014, at Michigan Stadium, the home of the University of Michigan football team. The Leafs won 3–2.

The Leafs were in a playoff position for much of the season, but a 2–12 record in the final 14 games of the season caused them to miss the playoffs.

Standings

Schedule and results

Pre-season

|- style="text-align:center;  background:#cfc;"
| 1 || 15 || @ Philadelphia Flyers || 4–3 || Budweiser Gardens  || 1–0–0 || Gibson (1–0–0)
|- style="text-align:center; background:#ffc;"
| 2 || 16 || Philadelphia Flyers || 2–3 (SO) || Air Canada Centre  || 1–0–1 || MacIntyre (0–0–1)
|- style="text-align:center;  background:#cfc;"
| 3 || 19 || @ Ottawa Senators || 3–2 || Canadian Tire Centre || 2–0–1 || MacIntyre (1–0–1)
|- style="text-align:center;  background:#cfc;"
| 4 || 21 || @ Buffalo Sabres || 3–2 (SO) || First Niagara Center  || 3–0–1 || Reimer (1–0–0)
|- style="text-align:center;  background:#cfc;"
| 5 || 22 || Buffalo Sabres  || 5–3  || Air Canada Centre  ||  4–0–1  || Bernier (1–0–0)
|- style="text-align:center; background:#fcc;"
| 6 || 24 || Ottawa Senators ||  2–3  || Air Canada Centre || 4–1–1   || Reimer (1–1–0)
|- style="text-align:center; background:#fcc;"
| 7 || 27 || @ Detroit Red Wings || 2–5 || Joe Louis Arena || 4–2–1 || Bernier (1–1–0)
|- style="text-align:center;  background:#cfc;"
| 8 || 28 || Detroit Red Wings  || 3–1 || Air Canada Centre  || 5–2–1 || Reimer (2–1–0) 
|- style="text-align:center;" bgcolor=""

Regular season

|- style="text-align:center; background:#ccffcc"
| 1 || 1 || @ Montreal Canadiens || 4–3 || Bell Centre (21,273) || 1–0–0  || 2 || Reimer (1–0–0)|| 
|- style="text-align:center; background:#ccffcc"
| 2 || 2 || @ Philadelphia Flyers ||  3–1  || Wells Fargo Center (19,872)  ||  2–0–0  || 4  || Bernier (1–0–0)|| 
|- style="text-align:center; background:#ccffcc"
| 3 || 5 || Ottawa Senators ||  5–4 (SO)  || Air Canada Centre (19,552) || 3–0–0 || 6 || Bernier (2–0–0)|| 
|- style="text-align:center; background:#fcc;"
| 4 || 8 || Colorado Avalanche || 1–2 || Air Canada Centre (19,388) || 3–1–0 || 6 || Bernier (2–1–0)|| 
|- style="text-align:center; background:#ccffcc"
| 5 || 10 || @ Nashville Predators  || 4–0 || Bridgestone Arena (16,671) || 4–1–0 || 8 || Bernier (3–1–0)|| 
|- style="text-align:center; background:#ccffcc"
| 6 || 12 || Edmonton Oilers || 6–5 (OT) || Air Canada Centre (19,379) || 5–1–0 || 10 || Bernier (4–1–0)|| 
|- style="text-align:center; background:#ccffcc"
| 7 || 15 || Minnesota Wild ||  4–1  || Air Canada Centre (19,283) || 6–1–0 || 12 || Reimer (2–0–0)|| 
|- style="text-align:center; background:#fcc;"
| 8 || 17 || Carolina Hurricanes  || 2–3 || Air Canada Centre (19,277) || 6–2–0 || 12 || Bernier (4–2–0)|| 
|- style="text-align:center; background:#fcc;"
| 9 || 19 || @ Chicago Blackhawks || 1–3 || United Center (21,801) || 6–3–0 || 12 || Bernier (4–3–0)|| 
|- style="text-align:center; background:#ccffcc"
| 10 || 22 || Anaheim Ducks || 4–2 || Air Canada Centre (19,408) || 7–3–0 || 14 || Bernier (5–3–0)|| 
|- style="text-align:center; background:#fcc;"
| 11 || 25 || @ Columbus Blue Jackets || 2–5 || Nationwide Arena (13,930) || 7–4–0 || 14 || Bernier (5–4–0)|| 
|- style="text-align:center; background:#ccffcc"
| 12 || 26 || Pittsburgh Penguins || 4–1 || Air Canada Centre (19,539) || 8–4–0 || 16 || Reimer (3–0–0)|| 
|- style="text-align:center; background:#ccffcc"
| 13 || 29 || @ Edmonton Oilers ||  4–0  || Rexall Place (16,839) ||  9–4–0  ||  18  || Reimer (4–0–0)|| 
|- style="text-align:center; background:#ccffcc"
| 14 || 30 || @ Calgary Flames || 4–2  || Scotiabank Saddledome (19,289) || 10–4–0 || 20 || Bernier (6–4–0)|| 
|-

|- style="text-align:center; background:#fcc;"
| 15 || 2 || @ Vancouver Canucks || 0–4 || Rogers Arena (18,910) || 10–5–0 || 20 || Reimer (4–1–0)||
|- style="text-align:center; background:#ccffcc"
| 16 || 8 || New Jersey Devils || 2–1 (SO) || Air Canada Centre (19,377) || 11–5–0 || 22 || Bernier (7–4–0)|| 
|- style="text-align:center; background:#fcc;"
| 17 || 9 || @ Boston Bruins || 1–3 || TD Garden (17,565) || 11–6–0 || 22 || Reimer (4–2–0)||
|- style="text-align:center; background:#ffc;"
| 18 || 13 || @ Minnesota Wild || 1–2 (SO) || Xcel Energy Center (17,897) || 11–6–1 || 23 || Bernier (7–4–1)|| 
|- style="text-align:center; background:#fcc;"
| 19 || 15 || @ Buffalo Sabres || 1–3 || First Niagara Center (19,070) || 11–7–1 || 23 || Bernier (7–5–1)||
|- style="text-align:center; background:#cfc;"
| 20 || 16 || Buffalo Sabres || 4–2 || Air Canada Centre (19,447) || 12–7–1 || 25 || Reimer (5–2–0)|| 
|- style="text-align:center; background:#cfc;"
| 21 || 19 || New York Islanders || 5–2 || Air Canada Centre (19,446) || 13–7–1 || 27 || Bernier (8–5–1)||
|- style="text-align:center; background:#fcc;"
| 22 || 21 || Nashville Predators || 2–4 || Air Canada Centre (19,256) || 13–8–1 || 27 || Bernier (8–6–1)|| 
|- style="text-align:center; background:#cfc;"
| 23 || 23 || Washington Capitals || 2–1 (SO) || Air Canada Centre (19,473) || 14–8–1 || 29 || Reimer (6–2–0)|| 
|- style="text-align:center; background:#fcc;"
| 24 || 25 || Columbus Blue Jackets || 0–6 || Air Canada Centre (19,241) || 14–9–1 || 29 || Reimer (6–3–0)|| 
|- style="text-align:center; background:#ffc;"
| 25 || 27 || @ Pittsburgh Penguins || 5–6 (SO) || Consol Energy Center (18,660) || 14–9–2 || 30 || Bernier (8–6–2)|| 
|- style="text-align:center; background:#ffc;"
| 26 || 29 || @ Buffalo Sabres || 2–3 (OT) || First Niagara Center (19,070) || 14–9–3 || 31 || Reimer (6–3–1)|| 
|- style="text-align:center; background:#fcc;"
| 27 || 30 || @ Montreal Canadiens || 2–4 || Bell Centre (21,273) || 14–10–3 || 31 || Bernier (8–7–2)||
|-

|- style="text-align:center; background:#fcc;"
| 28 || 3 || San Jose Sharks || 2–4 || Air Canada Centre (19,360) || 14–11–3 || 31 || Reimer (6–4–1)|| 
|- style="text-align:center; background:#cfc;"
| 29 || 5 || Dallas Stars || 3–2 (OT) || Air Canada Centre (19,164) || 15–11–3 || 33 || Bernier (9–7–2)||
|- style="text-align:center; background:#cfc;"
| 30 || 7 || @ Ottawa Senators || 4–3 (SO) || Canadian Tire Centre (19,559) || 16–11–3 || 35 || Reimer (7–4–1)|| 
|- style="text-align:center; background:#fcc;"
| 31 || 8 || Boston Bruins || 2–5 || Air Canada Centre (19,165) || 16–12–3 || 35 || Bernier (9–8–2)|| 
|- style="text-align:center; background:#fcc;"
| 32 || 11 || Los Angeles Kings || 1–3 || Air Canada Centre (19,375) || 16–13–3 || 35 || Bernier (9–9–2)|| 
|- style="text-align:center; background:#fcc;"
| 33 || 12 || @ St. Louis Blues || 3–6 || Scottrade Center (16,073) || 16–14–3 || 35 || Bernier (9–10–2)|| 
|- style="text-align:center; background:#cfc;"
| 34 || 14 || Chicago Blackhawks || 7–3 || Air Canada Centre (19,603) || 17–14–3 || 37 || Bernier (10–10–2)|| 
|- style="text-align:center; background:#fcc;"
| 35 || 16 || @ Pittsburgh Penguins ||  1–3  || Consol Energy Center (18,573) ||  17–15–3  || 37 || Bernier (10–11–2)|| 
|- style="text-align:center; background:#fcc;"
| 36 || 17 || Florida Panthers || 1–3 || Air Canada Centre (19,076) || 17–16–3 || 37 || Reimer (7–5–1)|| 
|- style="text-align:center; background:#cfc;"
| 37 || 19 || Phoenix Coyotes || 2–1 (SO) || Air Canada Centre (19,254) || 18–16–3  || 39 || Reimer (8–5–1)|| 
|- style="text-align:center; background:#ffc;"
| 38 || 21 || Detroit Red Wings || 4–5 (SO) || Air Canada Centre (19,508) || 18–16–4 || 40 || Bernier (10–11–3)|| 
|- style="text-align:center; background:#ffc;"
| 39 || 23 || @ New York Rangers || 1–2 (SO) || Madison Square Garden (18,006) || 18–16–5 || 41 || Bernier (10–11–4)|| 
|- style="text-align:center; background:#cfc;"
| 40 || 27 || Buffalo Sabres || 4–3 (SO) || Air Canada Centre (19,405) || 19–16–5 || 43 || Bernier (11–11–4)|| 
|- style="text-align:center; background:#cfc;"
| 41 || 29 || Carolina Hurricanes || 5–2 || Air Canada Centre (19,452) || 20–16–5 || 45 || Bernier (12–11–4) || 
|-

|- style="text-align:center; background:#cfc;"
| 42 || 1 || @ Detroit Red Wings || 3–2 (SO) || Michigan Stadium (105,491)  ||  21–16–5  || 47   || Bernier (13–11–4) || 
|- style="text-align:center; background:#fcc;"
| 43 || 4 || New York Rangers || 1–7 || Air Canada Centre (19,362) || 21–17–5 || 47 || Bernier (13–12–4) || 
|- style="text-align:center; background:#fcc;"
| 44 || 7 || New York Islanders || 3–5 || Air Canada Centre (19,164) || 21–18–5 || 47 || Bernier (13–13–4) || 
|- style="text-align:center; background:#fcc;"
| 45 || 9 || @ Carolina Hurricanes || 1–6 || PNC Arena (16,583) || 21–19–5 || 47 || Reimer (8–6–1) || 
|- style="text-align:center; background:#fcc;"
| 46 || 10 || @ Washington Capitals || 2–3 || Verizon Center (18,506) || 21–20–5 || 47 || Bernier (13–14–4) || 
|- style="text-align:center; background:#cfc;"
| 47 || 12 || New Jersey Devils || 3–2 (SO) || Air Canada Centre (19,175) || 22–20–5 || 49 || Bernier (14–14–4) || 
|- style="text-align:center; background:#cfc;"
| 48 || 14 || @ Boston Bruins || 4–3 || TD Garden (17,565) || 23–20–5 || 51 || Bernier (15–14–4) || 
|- style="text-align:center; background:#cfc;"
| 49 || 15 || Buffalo Sabres || 4–3 (SO) || Air Canada Centre (19,372) || 24–20–5 || 53 || Reimer (9–6–1) || 
|- style="text-align:center; background:#cfc;"
| 50 || 18 || Montreal Canadiens || 5–3 || Air Canada Centre (19,667) || 25–20–5 || 55 || Bernier (16–14–4) || 
|- style="text-align:center; background:#cfc;"
| 51 || 20 || @ Phoenix Coyotes || 4–2 || Jobing.com Arena (14,476) || 26–20–5 || 57 || Bernier (17–14–4) || 
|- style="text-align:center; background:#cfc;"
| 52 || 21 || @ Colorado Avalanche || 5–2 || Pepsi Center (14,877) || 27–20–5 || 59 || Reimer (10–6–1) || 
|- style="text-align:center; background:#fcc;"
| 53 || 23 || @ Dallas Stars || 1–7 || American Airlines Center (13,678) || 27–21–5 || 59 || Bernier (17–15–4) || 
|- style="text-align:center; background:#ffc;"
| 54 || 25 || @ Winnipeg Jets || 4–5 (OT) || MTS Centre (15,004) || 27–21–6 || 60 || Bernier (17–15–5) || 
|- style="text-align:center; background:#cfc;"
| 55 || 28 || Tampa Bay Lightning || 3–2 || Air Canada Centre (19,475) ||  28–21–6  || 62 ||  Bernier (18–15–5) || 
|- style="text-align:center; background:#cfc;"
| 56 || 30 || Florida Panthers   || 6–3 || Air Canada Centre (19,448) || 29–21–6 || 64 || Bernier (19–15–5) || 
|-

|- style="text-align:center; background:#cfc;"
| 57 || 1 || Ottawa Senators || 6–3 || Air Canada Centre (19,613) || 30–21–6 || 66 || Bernier (20–15–5) || 
|- style="text-align:center; background:#fcc;"
| 58 || 4 || @ Florida Panthers || 1–4 || BB&T Center (15,583) || 30–22–6 || 66 || Bernier (20–16–5) || 
|- style="text-align:center; background:#cfc;"
| 59 || 6 || @ Tampa Bay Lightning || 4–1 || Tampa Bay Times Forum (19,204) || 31–22–6 || 68 || Bernier (21–16–5) || 
|- style="text-align:center; background:#cfc;"
| 60 || 8 || Vancouver Canucks || 3–1 || Air Canada Centre (19,662) || 32–22–6 || 70 || Bernier (22–16–5) || 
|- style="text-align:center; background:#ffc;"
| 61 || 27 || @ New York Islanders || 4–5 (OT) || Nassau Veterans Memorial Coliseum (13,922) || 32–22–7 || 71 || Bernier (22–16–6) || 
|-

|- style="text-align:center; background:#ffc;"
| 62 || 1 || @ Montreal Canadiens || 3–4 (OT) || Bell Centre (21,273) || 32–22–8 || 72 || Bernier (22–16–7) || 
|- style="text-align:center; background:#fcc;"
| 63 || 3 || Columbus Blue Jackets || 1–2 || Air Canada Centre (19,577) || 32–23–8 || 72 || Reimer (10–7–1) || 
|- style="text-align:center; background:#cfc;"
| 64 || 5 || @ New York Rangers || 3–2 (OT) || Madison Square Garden (18,006) || 33–23–8 || 74 || Bernier (23–16–7) ||  
|- style="text-align:center; background:#cfc;"
| 65 || 8 || Philadelphia Flyers || 4–3 (OT) || Air Canada Centre (19,583) || 34–23–8 || 76 || Jonathan Bernier|Bernier (24–16–7) ||  
|- style="text-align:center; background:#cfc;"
| 66 || 10 || @ Anaheim Ducks || 3–1 || Honda Center (17,229) || 35–23–8 || 78 || Bernier (25–16–7) || 
|- style="text-align:center; background:#fcc;"
| 67 || 11 || @ San Jose Sharks || 2–6 || SAP Center at San Jose (17,562) || 35–24–8 || 78 || Reimer (10–8–1) || 
|- style="text-align:center; background:#cfc;"
| 68 || 13 || @ Los Angeles Kings || 3–2 || Staples Center (18,319) || 36–24–8 || 80 || Reimer (11–8–1) || 
|- style="text-align:center; background:#fcc;"
| 69 || 16 || @ Washington Capitals || 2–4 || Verizon Center (18,506) || 36–25–8 || 80 || Reimer (11–9–1) || 
|- style="text-align:center; background:#fcc;"
| 70 || 18 || @ Detroit Red Wings || 2–3 || Joe Louis Arena (20,066) || 36–26–8 || 80 || Reimer (11–10–1) || 
|- style="text-align:center; background:#fcc;"
| 71 || 19 || Tampa Bay Lightning || 3–5 || Air Canada Centre (19,585) || 36–27–8 || 80 || Reimer (11–11–1) || 
|- style="text-align:center; background:#fcc;"
| 72 || 22 || Montreal Canadiens || 3–4 || Air Canada Centre (19,789) || 36–28–8 || 80 || Reimer (11–12–1) || 
|- style="text-align:center; background:#fcc;"
| 73 || 23 || @ New Jersey Devils || 2–3 || Prudential Center (15,328) || 36–29–8 || 80 || Reimer (11–13–1) || 
|- style="text-align:center; background:#fcc;"
| 74 || 25 || St. Louis Blues || 3–5 || Air Canada Centre (19,505) || 36–30–8 || 80 || Bernier (25–17–7) || 
|- style="text-align:center; background:#fcc;"
| 75 || 28 || @ Philadelphia Flyers || 2–4 || Wells Fargo Center (19,963) || 36–31–8 || 80 || Bernier (25–18–7) || 
|- style="text-align:center; background:#fcc;"
| 76 || 29 || Detroit Red Wings || 2–4 || Air Canada Centre (20,270) || 36–32–8 || 80 || Bernier (25–19–7) || 
|-

|- style="text-align:center; background:#cfc;"
| 77 || 1 || Calgary Flames || 3–2 || Air Canada Centre (19,482) || 37–32–8 || 82 || Bernier (26–19–7) || 
|- style="text-align:center; background:#cfc;"
| 78 || 3 || Boston Bruins || 4–3 (OT) || Air Canada Centre (19,609) || 38–32–8 || 84 || Reimer (12–13–1) || 
|- style="text-align:center; background:#fcc;"
| 79 || 5 || Winnipeg Jets || 2–4 || Air Canada Centre (19,544) || 38–33–8 || 84 || Reimer (12–14–1) || 
|- style="text-align:center; background:#fcc;"
| 80 || 8 || @ Tampa Bay Lightning || 0–3 || Tampa Bay Times Forum (18,896) || 38–34–8 || 84 || Reimer (12–15–1) || 
|- style="text-align:center; background:#fcc;"
| 81 || 10 || @ Florida Panthers || 2–4 || BB&T Center (13,110) || 38–35–8 || 84 || MacIntyre (0–1–0) || 
|- style="text-align:center; background:#fcc;"
| 82 || 12 || @ Ottawa Senators || 0–1 || Canadian Tire Centre (20,500) || 38–36–8 || 84 || Reimer (12–16–1) || 
|-

Overtime statistics

Player statistics
Final stats

Skaters

Goaltenders

†Denotes player spent time with another team before joining the Maple Leafs. Stats reflect time with the Maple Leafs only.
‡Denotes player was traded mid-season. Stats reflect time with the Maple Leafs only.
Bold/italics denotes franchise record.

Awards and records

Awards

Records

Milestones
Updated as of February 9, 2014

Transactions
The Maple Leafs have been involved in the following transactions during the 2013–14 season.

Trades

Free agents acquired

Free agents lost

Player signings

Draft picks

Toronto Maple Leafs' picks at the 2013 NHL Entry Draft, held in Newark, New Jersey on June 30, 2013.

Draft notes
 The Toronto Maple Leafs' second-round pick went to the Chicago Blackhawks as the result of a trade on June 30, 2013, that sent Dave Bolland to Toronto in exchange for Anaheim's fourth-round pick in 2013 (117th overall), Edmonton's fourth-round pick in 2014 and this pick.
 The Toronto Maple Leafs' fourth-round pick went to the St. Louis Blues as the result of a trade on June 30, 2013, that sent a seventh-round pick in 2013 (203rd overall) and a fourth-round pick in 2014 to Nashville in exchange for this pick. The Nashville Predators had previously acquired this pick as the result of a July 3, 2011 trade that sent Matthew Lombardi and Cody Franson to the Maple Leafs in exchange for Brett Lebda, Robert Slaney and this pick.
 The Anaheim Ducks' fourth-round pick went to the San Jose Sharks as the result of a trade on June 30, 2013, that sent a fourth-round pick in 2013 (111th overall) and a fifth-round pick in 2014 to Chicago in exchange for a fifth-round pick in 2013 (151st overall) and this pick. Chicago previously acquired this pick as the result of a trade on June 30, 2013, that sent Dave Bolland to Toronto in exchange for a second-round pick in 2013 (51st overall), Edmonton's fourth-round pick in 2014 and this pick. The Toronto Maple Leafs had previously acquired this pick as a result of a February 9, 2011, trade that sent Francois Beauchemin to the Ducks in exchange for Joffrey Lupul, Jake Gardiner and this pick.

References

Toronto Maple Leafs seasons
Toronto Maple Leafs season, 2013-14
Toronto